Nelson Odhiambo (born 21 March 1989) is a Kenyan cricketer. He played for Kenya in the 2014 Cricket World Cup Qualifier tournament.

In January 2018, he was named in Kenya's squad for the 2018 ICC World Cricket League Division Two tournament. In September 2018, he was named in Kenya's squad for the 2018 Africa T20 Cup. The following month, he was named in Kenya's squad for the 2018 ICC World Cricket League Division Three tournament in Oman. He was the leading run-scorer for Kenya in the tournament, with 158 runs in five matches.

In May 2019, he was named in Kenya's squad for the Regional Finals of the 2018–19 ICC T20 World Cup Africa Qualifier tournament in Uganda. In September 2019, he was named in Kenya's squad for the 2019 ICC T20 World Cup Qualifier tournament in the United Arab Emirates.

References

1989 births
Living people
Kenyan cricketers
Kenya One Day International cricketers
Kenya Twenty20 International cricketers
Cricketers from Nairobi